Vincent Chong Ying-Cern (born 1979) is a Malaysian singer, internationally known by his stage name Vince , is the first reality TV star to issue from Malaysian Akademi Fantasia. Chong is popular as a R&B-inclined singer-songwriter. His popularity increased internationally after he teamed up with Nikki Gil and Alicia Pan to record the theme from High School Musical, Breaking Free (Asian Version).

Family, education and early career 

Chong was born in 1979 in Kuala Lumpur, Malaysia. His father was Chong Chen Kian, of Chinese ethnic origin, and mother Susan Ann Higgs from England. He has four younger siblings: Pamela, Daniel, Ian and Sean and an older sister Vanessa. His sisters Pamela and Vanessa competed in The Amazing Race Asia 2 and finished as runners-up. His brother, Sean is also one of the singers of Budi Bahasa Budaya Bangsa (1 Malaysia version) as representing Pan-Asean in Malaysia.

He started entertaining people through singing when he was a child and was involved in several church plays, singing competitions and modelling advertisements with his sister Vanessa. He once performed a solo opera  at the age of 14 in front of more than 2000 people.

He had experience in several church plays and theatre as a director and script writer. In college Chong formed a music band called IBNOT. Since then he had written and composed numerous songs as part of his hobby. The band played several genres of music including rock, R'n'B, jazz, alternative etc. Chong also had experience in recording back-up vocals for professional artistes, such as Ferhad in Anugerah Industri Muzik Awards in 2001.

Akademi Fantasia 

Chong's first serious singing competition was in the 2002 edition of Astro Talent Quest (ATQ). Not fluent in Mandarin (as he speaks Cantonese, English and Malay), Vince had a challenge to learn and memorise the Mandarin songs to remain in the competition. Eventually Chong became the first runner-up to Nicholas Teo, who won the competition that year.
 
In 2003 after returning from his holiday in Gold Coast, Australia, Vanessa and Rueben (Burn AF1) encouraged him to join Akademi Fantasia (season 1) which would be in its inaugural season. Chong and Rueben went to the audition in KL and successfully became part of the 12 AF finalists. For nine weeks he and his AF friends had to live separately from their families and friends.

Week after week Chong was finally crowned the winner for Akademi Fantasia's 1st season along with Khai as 1st runner up and Azizi as 2nd runner up. He received an offer to do a duet with Malaysian singer Nora a song titled Dilema'03 for her greatest hits album.

Upon "graduating" from Akademi Fantasia, Chong and his 11 classmates made a roadshow of Akademi Fantasia around Malaysia and Brunei. The group were interviewed by Azwan Ali in his popular talk show Cit Cat Azwan. The fans had voted them as the best newcomers interviewed in Cit Cat Azwan Award in 2003. Chong made his final appearance in a group when they were performed road tour in Brunei.

Vince 

Chong had decided to leave Maestro Talent to be an "independent" singer by joining EMI Malaysia to kick-off his singing career. It was a "very hard" journey for Chong as independent singer when his best friend-cum-competitor Khai overshadowed him with his "Dambaan Pilu". But he maintained determination as his first album self-titled Vince was also highly anticipated, featuring his single Mengapa Harus Cinta? entered several music charts. Chong was selected as one of the artistes to have a song in Anugerah Juara Lagu. Not only that, he was also placed third in the Asia New Singer Competition at Shanghai Music Festival 2004.

In 2004 and 2005 Chong's fame progressed after received several awards due to his achievement and he accepted an offer to be the lead actor for Yusof Haslam's new film Sembilu 2005. His first appearance on the silver screen had received positive reaction from his fans.

In 2005 he was chosen to sing one of the song in the soundtrack for Puteri Gunung Ledang titled Keranamu Kekasih.

Janji Vince 

In 2005 his second album Janji Vince was released, receiving mixed reactions from fans and critics. The album was said to be superior in quality compared to his first album, yet it sparked controversy when Vince pronounced the Arabic word Taala ("the one", as in one of the titles of Allah) in his song Berkobar-bokar. Later, the composer of the song Yassin clarified that the Taala actually means "to come".

He had been invited frequently to perform in private function and gospel shows, was highly on demand for Christmas performances in television.

High School Musical 

Chong represented Malaysia to sing the special Asian release edition of the hit Breaking Free(from Disney's High School Musical), alongside Singaporean Alicia Pan and Filipino Nikki Gil. In 2007, Chong and Nikki Gil teamed up as a Host for High School Musical: Around The World which has been aired in Disney's Channel.

Percayalah Sayang 

In 2007, Chong launched his compilation album Percayalah Sayang with features both new and old songs. This album is meant as Vince's big step into the regional music scene, especially Indonesia where he searched for new compositions and recorded the new content of the album. The new songs in the album, particularly, Percayalah Sayang, were described as inclined toward alternative rock.

High School Musical 2 

Chong has accepted offer to sing Malaysian version of You Are the Music in Me (from Disney's High School Musical 2) and Bahasa Melayu version entitled Kau Muzik Di Hatiku alongside another fellow Malaysian talented singer Jaclyn Victor. For the music video, the team production had decided to choose Putrajaya, Malaysia as the filming locations. Chong and Victor had participated for nationwide mall tour followed for fans of the High School Musical franchise. The video of their version of the song is now on the Special Edition DVD of High School Musical 2 (2008).

The collaboration between Chong and Victor are highly anticipated by both fans and after the success of You Are Music and Me collaboration, Chong and Victor still loves to do a duet performance together in private shows and television broadcast.

Frogway 2007: The Musical Theatre 

Chong had been given an offer to act as Eddy The Singing Frog after he successfully undergo Frogway 2007 casting. Frogway  was first performed on 30 July 1980, with a cast that included S. Jayasankaran as Eddy, and Indi Nadarajah. Frogway is the very first made-in-Malaysia musical, produced and directed by unknowns in theatre. Frogway 2007 is directed by Harith Iskander, one of Malaysia's best comedians. For Frogway 2007, the cast's list are Chong, Ash Nair, Harith Iskander, Elaine Daly, Chelsia Ng, Ina Febregas, Marielle Febregas and Thor Kah Hoong.

The show's begin at 23 August to 2 September 2007 at Actor Studio Bangsar. Chong recently confess to his fans and friends that acting in Musical Theatre is very challenging but good for his voice control as he had keep training for a few months just to make sure he will be fit physically and flawless voice control.

Future Project 

Recently Chong is involved in composing commercial jingles for Rakan Muda which is now aired as a Malaysian local television advertisement. He is now focusing on television production and also starting his personal company InVinceAble Tunes. He recently admitted to local entertainment magazines that he had experienced back pain since last July and he's now working hard to regain his fitness.

Although he is now more involved in television production, Chong has expressed his desire to produce a Mandarin-language album one day, not only to penetrate the Chinese-speaking market but also to fulfil his late grandfather's wish to see his grandson sing in his mother tongue.

Christmas album
He launched his new album with a Christmas jingle to it. The launch of the album was conducted at a bar in Damansara Perdana, Over 100 guests, media and fans attended the event as they tucked into the Christmas dishes and enjoyed the Guinness beer. He was joined on stage by local celebrity, television host and singer Burn, Daniel Veerapen and his brother Sean Chong. The album includes many re-makes and adds new twists to old Christmas classics while other songs are sung true to tradition. Chong's album is available for purchase at Canaan Land Bookstore in Cheras, Bandar Utama and Menara TA; and at CzipLee Bangsar.

Read more: Chong launches new album with Guinness – Central – New Straits Times http://www.nst.com.my/streets/central/chong-launches-new-album-with-guinness-1.191187#ixzz2LTQJ9YBh

Read more: Chong launches new album with Guinness – Central – New Straits Times http://www.nst.com.my/streets/central/chong-launches-new-album-with-guinness-1.191187#ixzz2LTQ8qJkrChong also performed a medley of songs from his latest album With You This Christmas at the event.

Read more: Chong launches new album with Guinness – Central – New Straits Times http://www.nst.com.my/streets/central/chong-launches-new-album-with-guinness-1.191187#ixzz2LTQ41YIK

Discography

Albums

Filmography

Television

Films

Theater

Achievements 

 2nd in Astro Talent Quest,2002
 1st in Akademi Fantasia Season 1
 Best Non-Malay Artist in Media Hiburan,2003
 Best New Artist (Male) in Anugerah ERA, 2004
 Best New Artist (Male) in ABH'2004
 Best Non-Malay Artist (Male) in ABH'2004
 Best New Artist (Male) in AIM 12
 Best New Artist (Male) in APM 2004
 Bronze in Asia New Singer Competition at Shanghai Music Festival, 2004
 Finalist for Juara lagu, Balada 2004
 Finalist Male Artist, ABP 2005
 Finalist Male Artist, AIM 2005
 Finalist Male Artist, APM 2005
 Finalist Lead Actor, Festival Filem Malaysia 2005
 Collaboration with Disney's HSM soundtrack "Breaking Free" 2006
 Collaboration with Disney's HSM2 soundtrack "You're Music in Me" with Jaclyn Victor 2007

Advertisement 

 Model for Hotlink Aktifkan Dirimu 2003–2005
 Model for Kotex "Women in My Life" 2004
 More than 20 front covers featured in Malaysian Entertainment Magazines
 Contributing song and voice for Rakan Muda, 's Advertisement 2008

Fan Club and Website 

Chong fans had established Vince Official Fan Club in 2004. The Fan Club's signature are "BelovedFans" @ BFs. In 2005, One of the BFs had established a website name BelovedFans  as Chong does not have an official website. The Belovedfans website founder is now making plan to re-construct the website for the fresher look and adding reliable sources.

One of Chong BF's Official committee members is now running Chong's Myspace Fan Club . The priority of opening a Myspace account is to gather all Vince's Chong Fans in Myspace, local and oversea as Myspace is the world top-ranked social-networking website.

Chong occasionally update his activity and chatting with his fans at Yahoo! Group .

Vince Chong is the ambassador for CSR company Orders.MY . Amidst the COVID-19 pandemic, it is a sincere movement to help food delivery vendors who don't have much of a budget. It started off during the MCO. The initiation was during the month of Ramadan and we had 800 vendors come on. Vince was wheeled in to help with marketing, the promo, and pushing it as much as he can. The vendors deal directly with the customer, and so there is no payment for using Orders.MY delivery platform.

References

External links 
 Vince's Official Forum

1979 births
Living people
Malaysian people of Chinese descent
Malaysian Christians
Malaysian people of English descent
21st-century Malaysian male singers
Malaysian television personalities
People from Kuala Lumpur
Malay-language singers
Akademi Fantasia winners